Queens Teens Voices is a local quarterly newspaper geared toward the youth in New York City and particularly in south-eastern Queens.  It has operated under the Afrikan Poetry Theatre since 2000.  The newspaper covers a multitude of topics from entertainment, sports, health, poetry and politics to other points of interest in the lives of adolescents. The editor-in-chief is Kubballa Waliyaya, brother of the co-founder of the Afrikan Poetry Theatre, Yusef Waliyaya.

External links 
Queens Teens Voices Website.
Queens Teens Voices Newsletter
Afrikan Poetry Theatre Online

Newspapers published in Queens, New York